CV6 may refer to:

 CV6, a postal district in the CV postcode area, UK
 USS Enterprise (CV-6), a former US aircraft carrier